The 18631 / 18632 Ranchi–Ajmer Garib Nawaz Express is an express train belonging to South Eastern Railway zone that runs between  and  in India. It is currently being operated with 18631/18632 train numbers on a weekly basis.

Service

The 18631/Ranchi–Ajmer Garib Nawaz Express has an average speed of 51 km/hr and covers 1678 km in 33h 10m. The 18632/Ajmer–Ranchi Garib Nawaz Express has an average speed of 51 km/hr and covers 1678 km in 32h 45m.

Coach composition

The train has standard ICF rakes with a max speed of 110 kmph. The train consists of 15 coaches :

 2 AC III Tier
 5 Sleeper coaches
 6 General Unreserved
 2 Seating cum Luggage Rake

See also 

 Ranchi Junction railway station
 Ajmer Junction railway station
 Ajmer–Bangalore City Garib Nawaz Express
 Garib Nawaz Express

Notes

References

External links 

 18632/Ajmer–Ranchi Garib Nawaz Express
 18631/Ranchi–Ajmer Garib Nawaz Express

Transport in Ranchi
Transport in Puri
Express trains in India
Rail transport in Rajasthan
Rail transport in Uttar Pradesh
Rail transport in Bihar
Rail transport in Jharkhand
Railway services introduced in 2017
Named passenger trains of India